Tha Tum is a district (amphoe) in the northern part of Surin province, northeastern Thailand.

Geography
Neighboring districts are (from the east clockwise): Rattanaburi, Sanom and Chom Phra of Surin Province; Satuek of Buriram province; Chumphon Buri of Surin; Kaset Wisai and Suwannaphum of Roi Et province.

Administration
The district is divided into 10 sub-districts (tambons), which are further subdivided into 165 villages (mubans). Tha Tum is a township (thesaban tambon) which covers parts of tambon Tha Tum. There are a further 10 tambon administrative organizations (TAO).

Tha Tum